is a 1972 Japanese exploitation film that is directed by Norifumi Suzuki and stars lead females of the genre, Reiko Ike and Miki Sugimoto.

Definition in Japanese exploitation cinema

"Sukeban" is a contraction of the Japanese words "suke" (female) and "bancho" (boss). The term describes a specific high school archetype which is usually (though not always) associated with juvenile delinquency. The term "zubeko" (bad girl) is no longer in vogue, but at the time these films were made was a hip slang expression that would more accurately have been translated as "bitch".

Sources 
 Dreamlogic Review

References 

1972 films
Films directed by Norifumi Suzuki
1970s exploitation films
1970s high school films
1970s Japanese films